The 2003–04 Kategoria e Parë was the 57th season of a second-tier association football league in Albania.

First stage

Second stage

Championship/promotion group

Classification group 
 Veleçiku was withdrew before 19th round
 The group was originally called a relegation group, but was named as Classification group since the ninth team Apolonia were spared from the relegation as the 2nd level is extended to 12 clubs from the next season.

Championship playoff

References

 Calcio Mondiale Web

Kategoria e Parë seasons
2
Alba